Khalish Dehlavi, who was born Kanwar Krishan Singh Bhayana, is a successful engineer and well-known Urdu poet of India. The Hindu highlighted the fact that, unusually, he has excelled in two very different fields: "Khalish is also a civil engineer who has designed the Sahar International Airport in Mumbai, the Jawaharlal Nehru Stadium here, and the election commissioner's office on the city's Ashoka Road. Poetry is Khalish's passion. Though he thanks his construction business for providing him with the luxuries of life, it is at a poetic soiree that Khalish comes into his own."

He was born in 1935 in the state of Punjab, India. He graduated from Devi Ahilya Vishwavidyalaya (also called Indore University) with a degree in civil engineering, but prior to that he obtained his first degree from Aligarh Muslim University. His late father Shri Mohan Lal Bhayana, an Urdu scholar himself, advised him to study Urdu literature. After joining Aligarh Muslim University, he mastered the Urdu language and Urdu literature and poetry. He became deeply involved in Urdu poetry and actively participated in Mushairas.

He adopted the pen name "Khalish" and came to be known popularly as "Khalish Dehlavi". He has written for almost all Urdu literary magazines in India, including Biswin Sadi. He also has many Hindi publications to his credit.

Khalish Dehlavi has been writing for the last fifty years and has now occupied an honourable position in Urdu and Hindi literature. He has received many awards and citations from eminent personalities like the former President of India Zakir Hussain,  the former Prime Minister of India Shri Inder Kumar Gujral, along with scholars, poets, editors and music personalities including Padmashree Saghar Nizami, Jan Nisar Akhtar, Makhmoor Sayeedi, Rehman Nayyar, and Naushad.

Works
Khalish Dehlavi's most recently published book is Khalish: An anthology of Urdu couplets (AuthorHouse, 2006. ). This book also contains English language translations of his couplets.

Khalish Dehlavi’s other published books include:
 Hasraten
 Yeh Qurbaten yeh Dooriyan
 Kuch Baaten Unki
 Chandni Ka Dhuan
 Mauj-e-Saba
 Harf-e-Nawan

References 

Urdu-language poets from India
Indian male poets
20th-century Indian Muslims
Aligarh Muslim University alumni
1935 births
Living people